JobTiger is one of the job sites in the Bulgarian web and a HR company with more than 11-year history and international experience in the field of human resources. The web site has been founded in 2001 by the Bulgarian-American Investments Fund.

Some of the biggest employers-partners of the site are Microsoft and Cisco Systems.

Institutions

For its lead efforts in up-to-dating the labor market and promoting the students’ probation among the employers, JobTiger is honoured by:
 Ministry of Economy;
 Ministry of Labour and Social Policy;
 Ministry of transport and communications;
 Ministry of State Administration and Administrative Reform.

Bulgarian Human Resources Management and Development Association (BHRMDA) bestowed Svetlozar Petrov, Managing Director of JobTiger, with the prize for partnership and support in 2005.

JobTiger wins the award in the "Investor in the Human Capital and Working Conditions" category in the annual 2005 and 2006 awards for Socially Responsible Business of the Bulgarian Business Leaders Forum (BBLF). By this award JobTiger was acknowledged for organizing the annual forum for students' internship National Careers Forum and for its project of creating and developing university career centers and making them popular among students, academic community, business and state administration.

Club of Corporate Donors

JobTiger, together with the Bulgarian Forum of Donors, GloBul, the United Bank of Bulgaria, OMV and the First Investment Bank, with the kind support of the British Embassy, is a co-founder of the Club of Corporate Donors – the first of this kind in Bulgaria. The establishment of the Club of Corporate Donors aims to develop and promote strategic business donation in Bulgaria. Its existence will change the environment of corporate charity through setting standards of transparent, regular and responsible donation and will spread information for the major trends in this field.

Career Centers

For its participation in the "Labor Market" project in 2005 JobTiger was awarded by the United States Agency for International Development (USAID) for exceptional merits in в creating and development of university career centers.

The 2006 edition of the Annual awards "Human resources 2006" is a recognition for the JobTiger's team and its efforts for the establishment and support of university career centers. The company’s managing director Svetlozar Petrov was honored with the award "Manager of a professional recruitment services website". The awards are organized by the "Human resources in Bulgaria and the Eurointegration" foundation and "Human resources" magazine.

References

External links

JobTiger.bg 

Service companies of Bulgaria
Business services companies established in 2000
Human resource management consulting firms
Employment websites in Bulgaria